Serhiy Serebrennikov (born 1 September 1976) is a retired Russian-born Ukrainian professional football player, a central midfielder. Since June 2011 till 2014 he worked a Belgian coach career.

Biography
At the age of 16, Serebrennikov moved from Ulan-Ude, in the east of Siberia, to Moscow where he would go to a sports school for 5 years. During this period, he played for football teams as Shinnik Yaroslavl, Vympel Rybinsk and Dynamo Vologda.

In 1999 when Serhiy was 22, he took on the Ukrainian citizenship, after his move to Dynamo Kyiv. So far, he has played 12 times for Ukraine, scoring once. Even though Johan Cruijff had words of praise for Serebrennikov, he never managed to fulfil the expectations in Kyiv.

Career in Belgium
In 2002, Serebrennikov was transferred to Belgian First division side Club Brugge. Due to injuries, he has only played 46 times for Club between 2002 and 2006.

In the 2005-2006 season, Serebrennikov was loaned for a half season to Charleroi SC. One season later, he was loaned for the whole season to Cercle Brugge, breaking his fibula during training in the first week of his loan.

Serebrennikov signed a 4-year deal with Cercle Brugge, starting with the 2007-2008 season. He signed his contract while he was playing on loan with Cercle.

On 30 June 2011, it was announced that Serebrennikov would be loaned out for the 2011–12 season to become player-manager at SV Roeselare (his first job as a coach).

Stats for main squads

International 
His first international game Serebrennikov played in a friendly game on 15 August 2001 against Latvia away.

International games

International goals

Honours
Club Brugge
Belgian First Division A: 2002–03
Belgian Super Cup: 2002, 2003

References
 Sergiy Serebrennikov player info at the official Club Brugge site 
 Serebrennikov in Belgium - fotos, goals, career

External links
 

Living people
1976 births
Russian footballers
Russian expatriate footballers
Expatriate footballers in Ukraine
Russian expatriate sportspeople in Ukraine
Ukrainian footballers
Ukrainian expatriate footballers
Expatriate footballers in Belgium
Ukraine international footballers
Cercle Brugge K.S.V. players
Association football midfielders
R. Charleroi S.C. players
Club Brugge KV players
FC Dynamo Kyiv players
FC Dynamo-2 Kyiv players
FC Dynamo-3 Kyiv players
FC Shinnik Yaroslavl players
Russian Premier League players
Ukrainian Premier League players
Ukrainian First League players
Ukrainian Second League players
Belgian Pro League players
Challenger Pro League players
K.S.V. Roeselare players
Russian football managers
Ukrainian football managers
Player-coaches
Russian emigrants to Ukraine
Naturalized citizens of Ukraine
People from Ulan-Ude
Ukrainian expatriate sportspeople in Belgium
FC Dynamo Vologda players
Russian expatriate football managers
Ukrainian expatriate football managers
Sportspeople from Buryatia